Maria Bruno (born 28 August 1992) is a Brazilian synchronised swimmer. She competed in the team event at the 2016 Summer Olympics.

References

External links
 

1992 births
Living people
Brazilian synchronized swimmers
Olympic synchronized swimmers of Brazil
Synchronized swimmers at the 2016 Summer Olympics
Place of birth missing (living people)
Pan American Games medalists in synchronized swimming
Pan American Games bronze medalists for Brazil
Synchronized swimmers at the 2015 Pan American Games
Artistic swimmers at the 2019 Pan American Games
Artistic swimmers at the 2019 World Aquatics Championships
Medalists at the 2011 Pan American Games
21st-century Brazilian women